In enzymology, a propionate—CoA ligase is an enzyme that catalyzes the chemical reaction

ATP + propanoate + CoA  AMP + diphosphate + propanoyl-CoA

The 3 substrates of this enzyme are ATP, propanoate, and CoA, whereas its 3 products are AMP, diphosphate, and propanoyl-CoA.

This enzyme belongs to the family of ligases, specifically those forming carbon-sulfur bonds as acid-thiol ligases.  The systematic name of this enzyme class is propanoate:CoA ligase (AMP-forming). This enzyme is also called propionyl-CoA synthetase.  This enzyme participates in propanoate metabolism.

References

 

EC 6.2.1
Enzymes of unknown structure